Saturnia pyri, the giant peacock moth, great peacock moth, giant emperor moth or Viennese emperor, is a Saturniid moth which is native to Europe. The species was first described by Michael Denis and Ignaz Schiffermüller in 1775. It is the largest European moth, with a wingspan reaching .

The giant peacock moth has a range that includes the Iberian Peninsula, southern France, northern Hungary, central and southern Serbia, Croatia, Montenegro, southern and eastern Bulgaria, southern Greece southern Turkey, south Kyrgyzstan, western Syria, Lebanon, north Israel, southern Romania, Russia, Ukraine, Czech Republic, Slovak Republic, Slovenia, North Macedonia and Italy and extends into Siberia and north Africa. It is absent from the UK, though a small handful of individuals have been recorded, likely of captive origin.

Additional images

References

External links

A caterpillar of Saturnia pyri filmed in an endemic gum forest in Turkey
Life cycle of Giant Silkworm Moth
Lepiforum e.V.
UKMoths
Vlindernet.nl 

Pyri
Moths of Europe
Moths of Asia
Moths described in 1775
Taxa named by Michael Denis
Taxa named by Ignaz Schiffermüller